Jorge Ernesto Guzmán Rodríguez (born August 2, 1963) is a Mexican luchador enmascarado, or masked professional wrestler and political activist, best known under the  ring name, El Hijo del Santo ("The Son of the Saint"). Guzmán is the youngest child, out of eleven, of Rodolfo Guzmán Huerta, better known as El Santo, a professional wrestler, film actor, and Mexican folk hero. Jorge Guzmán's son made his debut under the name "Santo Jr.", the third-generation Guzmán to use the name "Santo". Jorge Guzmán's uncles, Miguel "Black" Guzmán, Jesús Guzmán (Pantera Negra) and Jimmy Guzmán were also wrestlers. Axxel, Jorge Guzmán's nephew, originally wrestled as "El Nieto del Santo" ("The Grandson of El Santo") but Jorge Guzmán owned the rights to the "Santo" name and objected. Guzmán has also followed in his father's footsteps, as he has starred in several lucha films.

He made his wrestling debut in February 1982 under the name El Korak, but officially adopted his most famous ring name and silver mask in October 1982. During his career as Guzmán has worked for every major Mexican wrestling promotion including Consejo Mundial de Lucha Libre, Asistencia Asesoría y Administración, Universal Wrestling Association and World Wrestling Association as well as stints with the World Wrestling Federation (now WWE) in the United States as well as working in Japan for New Japan Pro-Wrestling, All Japan Pro-Wrestling and various other promotions. Early in his career he formed a successful tag team with Eddie Guerrero called "La Pareja Atomica", inspired by their fathers (El Santo and Gory Guerrero) teaming up from the 1940s to the 1960s. From 1998 through 2006 he also formed a very successful team with Negro Casas.

Over the span of his career Guzmán has held various championships, most significantly the AAA World Tag Team Championship, Mexican National Middleweight Championship, Mexican National Trios Championship, Mexican National Welterweight Championship, CMLL World Tag Team Championship, UWA World Lightweight Championship, UWA World Welterweight Championship, WWA Tag Team Championship and WWA World Welterweight Championship as well as an honorary championship awarded by the World Boxing Council. He's also won the Leyenda de Plata tournament (held in honor of his father), the 1995 version of the CMLL International Gran Prix tournament and the 2004 Gran Alternativa tournament. In 1997 he was voted into the Wrestling Observer Newsletter Hall of Fame.

Professional wrestling career
"Santito", as he is often called, was the only one of his father's 10 children to become a professional wrestler. He began wrestling without his father's consent in February 1982 as "El Korak" but he made his official debut as "El Hijo del Santo" in October of that year after he earned his college degree at the Universidad Iberoamericana in Communication Science per his father's request. He shared his father's look, the silver mask, tights and cape, and moves but he was shorter and, although he would never become the same cultural icon, he would become a better in-ring performer than his father.

Early in his career, he was wrestled mainly for World Wrestling Association (WWA) (The Tijuana circuit) and Universal Wrestling Association (UWA) (a promotion that worked in the Mexico City area) but he did make his debut for Empresa Mexicana de Lucha Libre (EMLL) the promotion that later became Consejo Mundial de Lucha Libre (CMLL) in Arena Mexico in the summer of 1983. He also was voted "Rookie of the Year" in Mexico.

He won his first title, the UWA World Lightweight Championship, in October 1985 and traded the title with Aristóteles. He next feuded with Espanto Jr. (whose father feuded with the original El Santo) and el Hijo del Santo took his mask. Espanto Jr. took el Hijo del Santo's title but el Hijo del Santo regained it in 1988 and took Espanto Jr.'s hair as well after winning a Luchas de Apuestas (Spanish for "Bet match"). During this time, he also feuded with Negro Casas, who would become his most important opponent, and took his hair in a 1987 match in the Los Angeles Olympic Auditorium.

In 1990, he debuted in Japan for Gran Hamada's Universal Lucha Libre promotion and moved up a weight class by winning the UWA World Welterweight Championship as well as the WWA Welterweight Championship. In late 1991, he left WWA and vacated the Welterweight title but continued to wrestle for UWA until the formation of Asistencia Asesoría y Administración (AAA). El Hijo del Santo regained the WWA Welterweight title and brought it with him to AAA. One of the first feuds he was put in was against Negro Casas' youngest brother, Heavy Metal. Heavy Metal took el Hijo del Santo's WWA Welterweight title and won the Mexican National Welterweight Championship but el Hijo del Santo would come out on top of the feud and took both titles from Heavy Metal before he lost them again to another young star, Psicosis.

His most memorable feud during his time with AAA was against the American team, Los Gringos Locos. Eddy Guerrero's stiffer Japanese style offense, combined with "Love Machine" Art Barr's cocky mannerisms made Los Gringos Locos a very exciting yet hated tag team. During the feud, they played up the old Pareja Atómica tag team which consisted of El Santo and Eddie's father, Gory Guerrero. Eddie turned on Santo, leading to a hair vs. mask challenge for the AAA When Worlds Collide pay-per-view. The match was changed at the last minute when Barr pleaded with AAA officials to be included on the show which would be broadcast in the United States. The new match was a double hair versus double mask match with Santo teaming with Octagón against Los Gringos Locos. El Hijo del Santo and Octagón were victorious in the critically acclaimed match that would receive a 5-star rating from Dave Meltzer but it was the last stand for Los Gringos Locos as Barr died three weeks later. AAA owner Antonio Peña tried to run an angle with an evil version of El Santo called "El Santo Negro" who supposedly came from South America. When the other members of Santo's family objected, the feud was scrapped and El Hijo del Santo jumped to CMLL in 1995.

The object of the jump was to revitalize his feud with Negro Casas. El Hijo del Santo lost a match to Casas at the CMLL 63rd Anniversary show on September 20, 1996, and took a brief hiatus. While gone, Negro Casas turned técnico (face) and his former allies, Scorpio, Jr. and Bestia Salvaje said they had a surprise for Casas. The set-up was a trios match with Negro Casas, El Dandy and Héctor Garza on the técnico side with Scorpio Jr. and Bestia Salvaje on the rudo (or heel) side. El Hijo del Santo came down to the ring with Scorpio and Salvaje but was wearing a disguise and pretending to be El Felino, the brother of Negro Casas. During the match, Scorpio and Salvaje began attacking Casas and the fans, unaware of the ruse, expected El Felino to save his brother from the beating. Once he entered the ring, El Hijo del Santo removed the disguise and revealed himself as Scorpio and Salvaje's partner, thus turning rudo for the first time in his career.

The fans were irate and fistfights broke out in the crowd as El Hijo del Santo attacked Casas. The feud helped ease sagging business caused by the split with AAA and the downturn of the Mexican economy. The following week, the two trios had a rematch and both El Dandy and Negro Casas challenged Santo to a hair vs. mask match. The match was made a triangle match on December 6, 1996. Santo took El Dandy's hair in a bloody match in front of a sold-out crowd in Arena Mexico. The feud would continue until the 64th anniversary show on September 19, 1997, where Negro Casas and El Hijo del Santo faced off in a dramatic hair vs. mask match. El Hijo del Santo won the match and began a slow face turn.

Although the angle was very successful and drew a lot of money for CMLL, El Hijo del Santo continued to wrestle as a babyface throughout the country, even teaming with Rey Mysterio in Tijuana. El Hijo del Santo began to be at odds with his heel allies, namely Scorpio Jr. and Bestia Salvaje. Finally, in September 1998, the face turn was made official when El Hijo del Santo's partners, Villano III and Fuerza Guerrera turned on Santo. Scorpio Jr. and Salvaje joined in on the beat down, leading Santo's next big feud.

Negro Casas and El Hijo del Santo began teaming together and chased Scorpio and Salvaje's recently won CMLL World Tag Team Championship. El Hijo del Santo and Casas defeated Scorpio and Salvaje for the titles on February 5, 1999, by disqualification but El Hijo del Santo and Casas refused to accept the titles. The big match in the feud was a mask/hair versus mask/hair tag match between the two teams at CMLL's 1999 Homenaje a Dos Leyendas show. Santo and Casas were victorious and took the tag titles as well. El Hijo del Santo had a brief falling out with CMLL management and the tag titles were vacated. He returned and won the tag titles again with Casas from Los Guerreros del Infierno (Último Guerrero and Rey Bucanero) but later lost them back to Los Guerreros in 2002. El Hijo del Santo took another sabbatical from CMLL with Perro Aguayo, Jr. filling in his spot on the roster. He returned to CMLL in the summer of 2004, initially to work with Místico to help him become a main eventer and to feud with Perro Aguayo, Jr. and his La Furia del Norte group. After the feud ended, he had a program with young Guerreros recruit Averno and they had a WWA Welterweight title match on October 22 where el Hijo del Santo retained and ended his tour with the company.

El Hijo del Santo has continued wrestling as an independent worker doing shows all over Mexico. El Hijo del Santo even started his own promotion called Todo x el Todo. the Promotions main show so far was a "25 Year Anniversary Show" shown by Televisa, a testament to el Hijo del Santo's appeal as Televisa rarely show independent promotions. the show featured a Relevos Suicidas tournament where the losing teams advance until the finals where the final team would fight each other over who would unmask. El Hijo del Santo ended up unmasking Pentagón Black in the finals, which meant that he booked himself to lose three times during the tournament. Around the time of el Hijo del Santo's 25th Anniversary the World Boxing Council (WBC) named el Hijo del Santo their "WBC World Wrestling Champion" clompete with title belt due to his "significant accomplishments in wrestling". While the title is technically an honorary championship el Hijo del Santo defended it several times in 2008. In 2008, El Hijo del Santo began running shows in London, England featuring independent talent from Mexico.

On May 11, 2013, El Hijo del Santo and his rival, Blue Demon Jr., joined forces to win the Pro Wrestling Revolution Tag Team Championship from Brian Cage and Derek Sanders.

On November 25, 2013, Santo announced a break to repair damage in his spinal area. After successful rehabilitation returned to the ring, teaming with his son El Santo Jr. at a Lucha Ilimitado card in Yakima, Washington on October 12, 2016, and closing out 2016 with two matches alongside his son El Santo Jr in Tijuana on December 16 and in Ciudad Juarez on December 18.

Personal life
In March, 2013 it was announced that one of Hijo del Santo's sons was going to travel to Japan to train in Pro Wrestling Noah wrestling school to prepare him for his wrestling debut under the ring name "El Nieto del Santo" ("The Grandson of El Santo"). The training started in May 2013 and he was set to return to Mexico three months later for his official in-ring debut. El Nieto del Santo was the first masked wrestler to attend the wrestling school, in honor of the lucha libre traditions and anonymity of their enmascarados. He made his wrestling debut in 2015, working under the name "Tempestad", before adopting the name "El Santo Jr." in July 2016.

Outside wrestling

Like his father, el Hijo del Santo has also crossed over into other media. He is the subject of a comic book published and appeared on the Mexican reality show Día de Perros. He was also the star of a 5 episode animated series on the Mexican version of Cartoon Network titled Santo vs The Clones. In 2007, he became a spokesperson for Wildcoast, an environmental non-profit organization, and campaigned to save sea turtles on the Gulf of Mexico from extinction. He has also been involved in gray whale campaigns and Tijuana clean-ups on behalf of Wildcoast.

In films

Hijo del Santo has appeared in several films, first with his father and then on his own or with other famous luchadores. In 2000 he starred in the film Infraterrestre, which received positive reviews from critics such as the respected Mexican film critic, David Wilt. In 2007 he appeared in the film Mil Mascaras vs. the Aztec Mummy (also known as Mil Mascaras: Resurrection), which also received positive reviews.

Championships and accomplishments
Asistencia Asesoría y Administración
AAA/IWC World Tag Team Championship (1 time) - with Octagón
Mexican National Middleweight Championship (1 time)
Mexican National Trios Championship (1 time) - with Super Muñeco and Ángel Azteca
Mexican National Welterweight Championship (1 time)
Consejo Mundial de Lucha Libre
CMLL World Tag Team Championship (3 times) - with Negro Casas
CMLL Torneo Gran Alternativa (2004) - with Místico
International Gran Prix: 1996
Leyenda de Plata: 1999
Pro Wrestling Revolution
PWR Tag Team Championship (1 time) - with Blue Demon Jr.
Southern California Pro-Wrestling Hall of Fame
Class of 2005
IWC Legacy
IWC Universal Champion (1 time, current)
Universal Wrestling Association
UWA World Lightweight Championship (3 times)
UWA World Welterweight Championship (2 times)
World Boxing Council
WBC World Wrestling Championship (1 time, current)
World Wrestling Association
WWA World Tag Team Championship (1 time) - with Perro Aguayo, Jr.
WWA World Welterweight Championship (10 times)
Pro Wrestling Illustrated
PWI ranked him # 63 of the 500 best singles wrestlers during the PWI Years in 2003.
PWI ranked him # 26 of the 100 best tag teams during the "PWI Years" with Octagon in 2003.
PWI ranked him # 14 of the 500 best singles wrestlers of the PWI 500 in 2003 and 2004
Wrestling Observer Newsletter awards
Wrestling Observer Newsletter Hall of Fame (Class of 1997)

Luchas de Apuestas record

Footnotes

References

External links

1963 births
Living people
Masked wrestlers
Mexican male professional wrestlers
Universidad Iberoamericana alumni
Professional wrestlers from Mexico City
AAA World Tag Team Champions
20th-century professional wrestlers
21st-century professional wrestlers
Mexican National Middleweight Champions
Mexican National Trios Champions
CMLL World Tag Team Champions
Mexican National Welterweight Champions
UWA World Welterweight Champions
UWA World Lightweight Champions